Anna-Maria Papaharalambous (Άννα-Μαρία Παπαχαραλάμπους, born 1974) is a Greek stage, television, and film actress. She came into prominence by starring in the dramatic series by Manousos Manousakis Psithiroi Kardias. She is married to actor Fanis Mouratidis and they have two children.

Stage Credits
Οι Ηλίθιοι
Phonetic: I Ilithioi
Translation: The Idiots

Television Credits
Ψίθυροι Καρδιάς
Phonetic: Psithiroi Kardias
Translation: Whispers of the Heart
Released: 1997
Character: Ερατώ (Erato)
Οι Τρεις Χήρες
Phonetic: Oi Treis Chires
Translation: The Three Widows
Released: 2000
Character: Ανθούλα (Anthoula)
Άρωμα Γύναικας
Phonetic: Aroma Gynaikas
Translation: Scent of a Woman 
Released: 2000
Character: Έλενα (Elena)
Σχεδόν Ποτε
Phonetic: Shedon Pote
Translation: Almost Never
Released: 2003
Character: Κάλια (Kalia)
Κανείς Δε Λέει Σ'αγαπώ
Phonetic: Kaneis The Leei S'agapo
Translation: No One Says "I Love You"
Released: 2004
Character: Κορίνα (Corina)
Μαργαρίτα
Phonetic: Margarita
Translation: Margarita
Released: 2007
Character: Μαργαρίτα (Margarita)
Μπαμπά Μην Τρέχεις
Phonetic: Baba Min Treheis
Translation: Daddy don't speed
Released: 2007
Character: Μόνα (Mona)
Κλινική Περίπτωση
Phonetic: Kliniki Periptosi
Translation: Clinical Case
Released: 2011
Character: Ανδριάννα (Andrianna)

Film Credits
Τα Ρόδινα Ακρογιάλια
Phonetic: Ta Rodina Akroyialia
Translation: The Rose Shores
Released: 1998
Character: Περμαχούλα (Permachoula)
Η Αγάπη Είναι Ελέφαντας
Phonetic: I Agapi Einai Elefantas
Translation:  Love is an Elephant
Released: 2000
Character: Χριστίνα (Christina)
Φτηνά Τσιγάρα
Phonetic: Ftina Tsigara
Translation: Cheap Cigarettes
Released: 2000
Character: Σοφία (Sophia)

Filmography

Television

External links
Ftina Tsigara Official Website
New York Times Review: Ftina Tsigara
New York Times Review: Ta Rodina Akroyialia
Hollywood.com: Ta Rodina Akroyialia
Yahoo! Movies: Shores of Twilight

1974 births
Living people
Greek film actresses
Greek stage actresses
Greek television actresses
Actresses from Athens